Vadim Tokarev (born 29 February 1972) is a US-based Russian professional boxer who competed from 2000 to 2008.

Professional career
Born in Yekaterinburg, Tokarev began his professional career in 2000 and won his first 15 fights in a row. He has a record of 26 wins, 1 loss, and 1 draw. He was undefeated in his first 24 fights picking up the Russian, IBF Inter-Continental and NABF cruiserweight titles.

His only defeat came against Marco Huck in an eliminator fight for the IBF Cruiserweight Title.

Professional boxing record

|-
|align="center" colspan=8|26 Wins (19 knockouts, 7 decisions), 1 Losses (0 knockouts, 1 decision), 1 Draw 
|-
| align="center" style="border-style: none none solid solid; background: #e3e3e3"|Result
| align="center" style="border-style: none none solid solid; background: #e3e3e3"|Record
| align="center" style="border-style: none none solid solid; background: #e3e3e3"|Opponent
| align="center" style="border-style: none none solid solid; background: #e3e3e3"|Type
| align="center" style="border-style: none none solid solid; background: #e3e3e3"|Round
| align="center" style="border-style: none none solid solid; background: #e3e3e3"|Date
| align="center" style="border-style: none none solid solid; background: #e3e3e3"|Location
| align="center" style="border-style: none none solid solid; background: #e3e3e3"|Notes
|-align=center
|Win
|
|align=left| Manu Ntoh
|TKO
|8
|27/11/2008
|align=left| Saint Petersburg, Russia
|align=left|
|-
|Win
|
|align=left| Chris Thomas
|TKO
|3
|03/10/2008
|align=left| Saint Petersburg, Russia
|align=left|
|-
|Win
|
|align=left| Marlon Hayes
|TKO
|3
|13/10/2007
|align=left| Moscow, Russia
|align=left|
|-
|Loss
|
|align=left| Marco Huck
|MD
|12
|26/05/2007
|align=left| Bamberg, Germany
|align=left|
|-
|Win
|
|align=left| Shane Swartz
|KO
|2
|25/11/2006
|align=left| Warsaw, Poland
|align=left|
|-
|Win
|
|align=left| Felix Cora Jr.
|TKO
|4
|18/05/2006
|align=left| Hollywood, Florida, U.S.
|align=left|
|-
|Win
|
|align=left| Ali Ismailov
|RTD
|8
|17/02/2006
|align=left| Kazan, Russia
|align=left|
|-
|Win
|
|align=left| Darnell Wilson
|UD
|10
|18/08/2005
|align=left| Kazan, Russia
|align=left|
|-
|Win
|
|align=left| Michael Simms
|UD
|10
|13/05/2005
|align=left| Kazan, Russia
|align=left|
|-
|Win
|
|align=left| Troy Beets
|KO
|5
|01/10/2004
|align=left| Kazan, Russia
|align=left|
|-
|Win
|
|align=left| Arthur Williams
|UD
|10
|29/04/2004
|align=left| Kazan, Russia
|align=left|
|-
|Win
|
|align=left| Darnell Wilson
|UD
|10
|29/04/2004
|align=left| Kazan, Russia
|align=left|
|-
|Win
|
|align=left| Marvin Aguilar
|TKO
|3
|20/12/2003
|align=left| Podolsk, Russia
|align=left|
|-
|Draw
|
|align=left| Firat Arslan
|PTS
|12
|16/08/2003
|align=left| Nürburg, Germany
|align=left|
|-
|Win
|
|align=left| George Sabuni
|TKO
|1
|11/06/2003
|align=left| Kazan, Russia
|align=left|
|-
|Win
|
|align=left| Merick Roberge
|KO
|2
|15/03/2003
|align=left| Kazan, Russia
|align=left|
|-
|Win
|
|align=left| Valeri Semiskur
|TKO
|2
|25/12/2002
|align=left| Kazan, Russia
|align=left|
|-
|Win
|
|align=left| Muslim Biarslanov
|UD
|10
|03/11/2002
|align=left| Ekaterinburg, Russia
|align=left|
|-
|Win
|
|align=left| Goran Dinic
|KO
|2
|21/09/2002
|align=left| Kazan, Russia
|align=left|
|-
|Win
|
|align=left| Evgeny Galchenko
|TKO
|3
|04/07/2002
|align=left| Ekaterinburg, Russia
|align=left|
|-
|Win
|
|align=left| Dmitry Lyakhovetsky
|TKO
|2
|18/04/2002
|align=left| Ekaterinburg, Russia
|align=left|
|-
|Win
|
|align=left| Sergey Korolev
|UD
|10
|28/02/2002
|align=left| Ekaterinburg, Russia
|align=left|
|-
|Win
|
|align=left| Dmitry Gerasimov
|TKO
|5
|22/12/2001
|align=left| Kazan, Russia
|align=left|
|-
|Win
|
|align=left| Timofey Maklakov
|TKO
|2
|28/10/2001
|align=left| Ekaterinburg, Russia
|align=left|
|-
|Win
|
|align=left| Teymuraz Kekelidze
|TKO
|2
|20/09/2001
|align=left| Ekaterinburg, Russia
|align=left|
|-
|Win
|
|align=left| Valery Makeev
|TKO
|5
|31/05/2001
|align=left| Ekaterinburg, Russia
|align=left|
|-
|Win
|
|align=left| Artem Vychkin
|TKO
|2
|15/03/2001
|align=left| Ekaterinburg, Russia
|align=left|
|-
|Win
|
|align=left| Denis Deryabkin
|UD
|6
|08/02/2001
|align=left| Ekaterinburg, Russia
|align=left|
|-
|Win
|
|align=left| Vitaly Mugunov
|UD
|6
|08/12/2000
|align=left| Ekaterinburg, Russia
|align=left|
|}

External links
 

Living people
Cruiserweight boxers
1972 births
American male boxers
Russian male boxers
Sportspeople from Yekaterinburg